Gui Bonsiepe [ˈgɪː ˈbo˘nsɪːpe˘] (born 23 March 1934) is a German designer, teacher and writer. Especially in South America and Germany, his publications are considered standards of design theory.

Life 
Gui Bonsiepe was born in Glücksburg, and studied Graphics and Architecture until 1955 at Bayerische Akademie der Schönen Künste, Munich and at TU München. Until 1959, he studied at Ulm School of Design (Hochschule für Gestaltung Ulm) in the Information Department. 
Between 1960 and 1968, he worked as an assistant professor at Ulm School of Design.
After closure of the Ulm School of Design in 1968, Bonsiepe relocated to South America, working as a design consultant. From 1970 to 1973, he led the design team for the transaction room of the Cybersyn project.
From 1987 to 1989, Bonsiepe worked as an interface designer in a software company in Emeryville, California, United States.

From 1993 to 2003, Bonsiepe was Professor for Interface Design at Köln International School of Design (KISD) in Germany. He was Professor for Integrated Media at Escola Superior de Desenho Industrial (ESDI), Universidade do Estado de Rio de Janeiro, where he planned and established a Master of Design study program.

He lives in La Plata, Buenos Aires and in Florianópolis, Brasil.

References

Living people
Academic staff of the Technical University of Cologne
Design researchers
1934 births
Technical University of Munich alumni
Academic staff of the Rio de Janeiro State University
German expatriates in Brazil
German male writers